Ngana is an administrative ward in the Kyela District of the Mbeya Region of Tanzania. In 2016 the Tanzania National Bureau of Statistics report there were 8,755 people in the ward, from 7,944 in 2012.

Villages / vitongoji 
The ward has 4 villages and 22 vitongoji.

 Kasumulu
 Ilondo
 Jua Kali
 Kasumulu
 Kasumulu Kati
 Ngumbulu
 Mwalisi
 Bujesi
 Itope
 Kani
 Lusungo
 Makeje
 Ngonga
 Ngana
 Kandete
 Majengo
 Malola
 Mbwata
 Mwega
 Nduka
 Ushirika
 Ibwengubati
 Kasyunguti
 Lusungo
 Makasu
 Mpalakata

References 

Wards of Mbeya Region